Anu Choudhury is an Indian actress who predominantly works in Odia, Telugu, chhattisgarhi, Bengali and Hindi films. She has starred in more than 65 films. Her debut Odia film was Maa Goja Bayani.

Career

Career in Odia Film industry 

Anu began her career in Odia film as a child artist. She acted in two movies, Badhu Nirupama and Mamata Mage Mula with very small roles in these two movies. Her first film as main lead actress was Maa Gojabayani in 1998. In her 1st movie though there was no such big stars, but still with her effort she was eligible to compete with Rachana Banerjee in Ollywood during that period. She won praise for her acting in the film. For her first movie she got Odisha State Film Award for Best Actress for that movie in Chalachitra Jagat award. Since then, she has acted in a number of films, Biswaprakash. In Biswaprakash she acted with actress Nandita Das which movie is a part of Indian Panorama.

Then after she did movies like Mana Rahigala Tumari Thare, Maa-O-Mamata, Gare Sindura Dhare Luha. For Gare Sindura Dhare Luha movie she got Orissa State Film Awards as best actress. Anu next appeared in the movie Rakhi Bandhili Mo Rakhiba Mana. She also acted in Sashu Ghara Chalijibi which was produced by Rajshri Productions and co-starred Siddhanta Mahapatra.

Her first film in Bengali was Ram Lakshman but Surya was released first in 2004. Both films had Prosenjit Chatterjee in male lead. She has also acted in a Telugu movie Subha Bela directed by V.B. Ramana. Anu gave a super hit movie " Maa Gojabayani" at the entry of her into film industry.  Her 1st Telugu movie was Subhavela. At the peak of her career she got married and after a very short time period, she had seven releases as lead actress in a single year 2007 out of which four were hits. Due to some personal issues she left Odia industry for two years and back to industry after two years with two flop movies. But again she gave a hit number with " Pahili Raja" in which she had played a cop character.

In 2022, ahe debuted in Odia television with Sarbajita Anu on Zee Sarthak.

Career in South industry 

Anu Choudhury started her career with Telugu movie Subhavela which was into controversy in 2000. 

The movie revolves around a young woman, Satya, (Anu) who dumps her bridegroom at the altar, not once but four times. The reason – her best friend attempts suicide after marriage. This unusual behaviour attracts the attention of journalist Surya (Vijay), who begins writing a serial version for his newspaper, which turns into a best-seller.

Anu Choudhury continued to act in Muthyam and then Manasu Telusuko, but did not have much success in the south Indian film industry.

Career in Bengali industry 
Anu started her Bengali film career in 2004 with movie Surya opposite Prasenjit Chatterjee. Then she continued to be attached with Bengali film industry as one after another she appeared in movies like Ram Laxman, Dadar Adesh, etc.

Her notable movies with Prasenjit Chatterjee are Surya, Dadar Adesh, Rajmohol, Jamai Raja, Rajkumar etc.  Anu also appeared in the movies Hangama, Abhimanyu and Mahaguru. She was also seen a very prominent character in Thikana Rajpath with a deglam role. Lastly she was seen in " Aami Aachi Sei Je Tomar " in 2011.

Bollywood Debut and film breakthrough 
Anu got a break in Hindi movie Nirvana 13, directed by Jitin Rawat, currently streaming on MX Player. Nirvana 13 is a story about a patient's cry for relief from agony and a nurse who is silently wishing for the same. The two have a conversation about their struggles with morality and helplessness and their constant quest for a way out. This provokes different perspectives of the pragmatic and spiritual aspects of life and death.

Anu Choudhury is playing the character of Marium D'souza in the movie. Anu received best actress award for her 1st Hindi movie Nirvana 13 in Los Angeles movie award. She was the only Indian actress selected for this award in 2011.

Anu has also worked in a film Babloo Happy Hai based on youth released in 2013 with talented director Nila Madhab Panda with costars Parvin Dabas, Sahil Anand, Erica Fernandes.

The director Nila Madhab Panda said,"I have seen Anu's work and really liked her. It was Anu's talent that made me finalise her."

Social activism and commercials 

Anu Choudhury has been a committed social activist, active in supporting child survival and fighting AIDS and injustice in real life. Anu has worked as brand ambassador for UNICEF, Lalchand Jewellers, Kanchan Jewellery, Ruchi Curry Powder, Epari Sadashiv Jewellery etc. She has been brand ambassador for more than 20 commercials. She says, "Along with films I have been doing commercials for the last ten years and it's natural that the product manufacturers want us to endorse their brand since we have face value. And it's obvious that we won't do it for charity but then money is not everything." She has been brand ambassador for prestigious Emami edible oil.
Anu is also working as brand ambassador for FAME (First Academy of Media and Entertainment)in Odisha. Anu Chaudhury, along with Ms Shabana Azmi, renowned actress and former Member of Parliament, noted Indian classical dancer Ms Shovan Narayan and rockstar Mr Subir Malik, member of the Parikrama band, were declared as brand ambassador for safe motherhood, champion and Youth Icon for Safe Motherhood, respectively.

Recently, Anu Choudhury is appointed as Brand ambassador for a public awareness campaign, "Bijuli Didi" on behalf of all the electric distribution utilities of the State, CESU, NESCO, WESCO and SOUTHCO, and all the franchisees working in the CESU area. The brand Bijuli Didi was unveiled at a function by Odisha Electricity Regulatory Commission (OERC) Chairman Satya Prakash Nanda.As part of the Bijuli Didi campaign, Anu will make people aware about simple facts that will help people to conserveelectricity, check power theft and pay bills on time.

On 1 November 2013 Anu Choudhury was declared to be part of TeachAids, is a nonprofit organisation that develops HIV prevention education technology materials, based on an approach invented through research at Stanford University. On 21 November 2013 official launching of TeachAids of Odia version was done. A teaser of the animated software, which features the caricatures and voices of actors Akash Dasnayak, Anu Choudhury, Prashant Nanda and Odissi danseuse Aruna Mohanty, will be released online (www.teachaids.org) on 1 December to mark the occasion of World Aids Day.Anu said the "revolutionary product" would combat ignorance about HIV as it is likely to be introduced in schools and colleges from next year.A preview of the film was screened for the media here on Thursday.

Filmography

Awards 
Anu Chowdhury was adjudged the Best Actress for her performance in Sasughara Chalijibi at the 2005 Orissa State Film Awards ceremony held at Bhubaneswar on 30 May 2007. She won the best Actress Award in the 4th Cine India International Film Festival, Noida for her portrayal of a second generation refugee from East Bengal in the Kadambinee Media Pvt Ltd. productions Kathantara.

On 30 December 2007, Anu won the Best Actress Award at the "Chalachhitra Jagat Pratibha Samman – 2007" for her performance in the Odia movie Lal Tuku Tuku Sadhaba Bahu. she is four time state award winner for best actress category. Anu again received best actress award for her 1st Hindi movie Nirvana 13 in Los Angeles movie award. She was the only Indian actress selected for this award in 2011.

State Awards
Anu has received the glorious Orissa State Film Awards for Best Actress four times
 2001 – Orissa State Film Awards, Gare Sindura Dhare Luha
 2002 – Orissa State Film Awards, Rakhi Bandhili Mo Rakhiba Mana
 2004 – Orissa State Film Awards, Omm Santi Omm
 2005 – Orissa State Film Awards, Sashu Ghara Chalijibi

International Awards
 2006 – Best Actress award for Kathantara in 4th International Film Festival of India, Noida
 2011 – Best Actress award for Nirvana 13 in Los Angeles Movie Award

References

Notes

External links 
 

Living people
Actresses from Bhubaneswar
Indian film actresses
Actresses in Odia cinema
Actresses in Bengali cinema
Actresses in Telugu cinema
Actresses in Hindi cinema
Female models from Odisha
Indian women activists
Women in Odisha politics
Bharatiya Janata Party politicians from Odisha
Year of birth missing (living people)
20th-century Indian actresses
21st-century Indian actresses